The 1978 smallpox outbreak in the United Kingdom resulted in the death of Janet Parker, a British medical photographer, who became the last recorded person to die from smallpox. Her illness and death, which was connected to the deaths of two other people, led to the Shooter Inquiry, an official investigation by government-appointed experts triggering radical changes in how dangerous pathogens were studied in the UK.

The Shooter Inquiry found that Parker was accidentally exposed to a strain of smallpox virus that had been grown in a research laboratory on the floor below her workplace at the University of Birmingham Medical School. Shooter concluded that the mode of transmission was most likely airborne through a poorly maintained service duct between the two floors. However, this assertion has been subsequently challenged, including when the University of Birmingham was acquitted following a prosecution for breach of Health and Safety legislation connected with Parker's death. Several internationally recognised experts produced evidence during the prosecution to show that it was unlikely that Parker was infected by airborne transmission in this way. Although there is general agreement that the source of Parker's infection was the smallpox virus grown at the Medical School laboratory, how Parker contracted the disease remains unknown.

Background

Smallpox research at the Birmingham Medical School
Smallpox is an infectious disease unique to humans, caused by either of two virus variants named Variola major and Variola minor. The World Health Organization (WHO) had established a smallpox eradication programme and, by 1978, was close to declaring that the disease had been eradicated globally. The last naturally occurring infection was of Variola minor in Somalia in 1977.

At the time of the 1978 outbreak, a laboratory at University of Birmingham Medical School had been conducting research on variants of smallpox virus known as "whitepox viruses", which were considered to be a threat to the success of the WHO's eradication programme. The laboratory was part of the Microbiology Department, the head of which was virologist Henry Bedson, son of Sir Samuel Phillips Bedson.

A smallpox outbreak in the area had occurred in 1966, when Tony McLennan, a medical photographer working at the medical school, contracted the disease. He had a mild form of the disease, which was not diagnosed for eight weeks. He was not quarantined and there were at least twelve further cases in the West Midlands, five of whom were quarantined in Witton Isolation Hospital in Birmingham. There are no records of any formal enquiries on the source of this outbreak despite concerns expressed by the then head of the laboratory, Peter Wildy.

In 1977, the WHO had told Henry Bedson that his application for his laboratory to become a Smallpox Collaborating Centre had been rejected. This was partly because of safety concerns; the WHO wanted as few laboratories as possible handling the virus.

Janet Parker
Parker was born in March 1938, and was the only daughter of Frederick and Hilda Witcomb (née Linscott). She was married to Joseph Parker, a Post Office engineer, and lived in Burford Park Road, Kings Norton, Birmingham, UK. After several years as a police photographer she joined the University of Birmingham Medical School, where she was employed as a medical photographer in the Anatomy Department. Parker often worked in a darkroom above the laboratory where research on smallpox viruses was being conducted.

The infection and related events

Parker's illness and death
On 11 August 1978, Parker (who had been vaccinated against smallpox in 1966, but not since) fell ill; she had a headache and pains in her muscles. She developed spots that were thought to be a benign rash, or chickenpox. On 20 August at 3pm, she was admitted to East Birmingham Hospital and a clinical diagnosis of Variola major, the most serious type of smallpox, was made by consultant Alasdair Geddes.

By this time the rash had spread and covered all Parker's body, including the palms of her hands and soles of her feet, and it was confluent on her face.  At 10pm she was on her way to Catherine-de-Barnes Isolation Hospital near Solihull. By 11pm all her close contacts, including her parents, were placed in quarantine. Her parents were later also transferred to Catherine-de-Barnes. The next day, poxvirus infection was confirmed by Henry Bedson, then Head of the Smallpox laboratory at the Medical School, by electron microscopy of vesicle fluid, which Geddes had sampled from Parker's rash. (Samples of the fluid were also collected by a biomedical scientist for examination at the Regional Virus Laboratory, which was in East Birmingham Hospital). Parker died of smallpox at Catherine-de-Barnes on 11 September 1978. She was the last recorded person to die from smallpox.

Special disease control measures had to be put into place for Parker's funeral. Ron Fleet from Sheldon, who at the time of Parker's death worked for Solihull funeral director Bastocks and later for the BBC at Pebble Mill, recalled that he was told that authorities would not allow the body to be stored in a fridge in case the virus managed to multiply:

Concerns over the survival of infectious virus in Parker's body were well-founded, and at the inquest the coroner, who signed Parker's cremation certificate, disallowed an autopsy for safety reasons.

Quarantine and containment
Many people had close contact with Parker before she was admitted to hospital. The outbreak prevention response included 260 people being immediately quarantined, several of them at Catherine-de-Barnes Hospital, including the ambulance driver who transported Parker. Over 500 people who had been (or had possibly been) in contact with Parker were given vaccinations against smallpox. On 26 August, health officials went to Parker's house in Burford Park Road, Kings Norton, and fumigated her home and car. On 28 August, five hundred people were placed in quarantine in their homes for two weeks.

Parker's mother contracted smallpox on 7 September, despite having been vaccinated against the disease on 24 August. Her case was described as "very minor" and she was subsequently declared free from infection and was discharged from hospital on 22 September. Other than Parker's mother, no further cases occurred. The other close contacts, which included two biomedical scientists from the Regional Virus Laboratory, were released from quarantine in Catherine-de-Barnes on 10 October 1978.

Birmingham was declared officially free of smallpox on 16 October 1978. Over a year later, in October 1979, the university authorities fumigated the Medical School East Wing. The ward at Catherine-de-Barnes Hospital in which Parker had died was still sealed off five years after her death, all the furniture and equipment inside left untouched.

Related deaths
On 5 September 1978, Parker's 71-year-old father, Frederick Witcomb, of Myrtle Avenue, Kings Heath, died while in quarantine at Catherine-de-Barnes Hospital. He appeared to have died following a cardiac arrest when visiting his daughter. No post-mortem was carried out on his body because of the risk of smallpox infection.

On 6 September 1978, Henry Bedson, head of the Birmingham Medical School microbiology department, committed suicide while in quarantine at his home in Cockthorpe Close, Harborne. He cut his throat in the garden shed and died at Birmingham Accident Hospital a few days later. His suicide note read: In Bedson's Munk's Roll biography published by the Royal College of Physicians, virologist Peter Wildy and Sir Gordon Wolstenholme wrote:

Subsequent investigations and reactions

The Shooter inquiry

An official government inquiry into Parker's death was conducted by a panel led by microbiologist R.A. Shooter, and comprising Christopher Booth, Sir David Evans, J.R. McDonald, David Tyrrell and Sir Robert Williams, with observers from the World Health Organization (WHO), The Health and Safety Executive and the Trades Union Congress.

The inquiry's report noted that Bedson had failed to inform the authorities of changes in his research that could have affected safety. Shooter's enquiry discovered that the Dangerous Pathogens Advisory Group had inspected the laboratory on two occasions and each time recommended that the smallpox research be continued there, even though the facilities at the laboratory fell far short of those required by law. Several of the staff at the laboratory had received no special training. Inspectors from the WHO had told Bedson that the physical facilities at the laboratory did not meet WHO standards, but had nonetheless only recommended a few changes in laboratory procedures. Bedson misled the WHO about the volume of work handled by the laboratory, telling them that it had progressively declined since 1973, when in fact it had risen substantially as Bedson tried to finish his work before the laboratory closed. Shooter also found that while Parker had been vaccinated, it had not been done recently enough to protect her against smallpox. A foreword by the Secretary of State for Social Services, Patrick Jenkin, noted that the University of Birmingham disputed the report's findings.

The report concluded that Parker had been infected by a strain of smallpox virus called Abid (named after the three-year-old Pakistani boy from whom it had originally been isolated), which was being handled in the smallpox laboratory during 24–25 July 1978. It found that there was "no doubt" that Parker had been infected at her workplace, and identified three possible ways in which this could have occurred: air current transmission; personal contact; or contact with contaminated apparatus. The report favoured air current transmission and concluded that the virus could have travelled in air currents up a service duct from the laboratory below to a room in the Anatomy Department that was used for telephone calls. On 25 July, Parker had spent much more time there than usual ordering photographic materials because the financial year was about to end.

Since Shooter's Report potentially played an important role in the court case against the university for breach of safety legislation, its official publication was postponed until the outcome of the trial was known, and it was not published until 1980.

Once it was published it had a significant impact. Shooter's report was debated by Parliament. Nicolas Hawkes wrote, in 1979, that:

Prosecution
On 1 December 1978 the Health and Safety Executive announced their intention to prosecute the university for breach of safety legislation. The case was heard in October 1979 at Birmingham Magistrates' Court.

Although the source of infection was traced, the mode and cause of transmission was not. Evidence presented by several internationally recognised experts, including Kevin McCarthy, Allan Watt Downie and Keith R. Dumbell, showed that airborne transmission from the laboratory to the telephone room where Parker was supposedly infected was highly improbable. The experts calculated that it would require  of virus fluid to have been aspirated (meaning, in this context, removed by suction of fluid and cells through a needle)  and it would take 20,000 years for one particle to travel to the telephone room at the rate the fluid was aspirated. It was additionally found that although the Shooter Inquiry noted the poor state of the duct sealing in the laboratory, this was caused after the outbreak by engineers fumigating the laboratory and ducts. The university was found not guilty of causing Parker's death.

Other litigation
In August 1981, following a formal claim for damages made by the trade union Association of Scientific, Technical and Managerial Staffs in 1979, Parker's husband, Joseph, was awarded £25,000 in compensation.

Conclusions and impact

Although it seems clear that the source of Parker's infection was the smallpox virus grown at the University of Birmingham Medical School laboratory, it remains unknown how Parker came to be infected. Shooter's criticisms of the laboratory's procedures triggered radical changes in how dangerous pathogens were studied in the UK, but the inquiry's conclusions on the transmission of the virus have not been generally accepted. Professor Mark Pallen, who wrote a book about the case, says that the air duct theory "was not really believed by anyone in the know". Brian Escott-Cox QC, who successfully defended the university in the subsequent prosecution, said in 2018:

In light of this incident, all known stocks of smallpox were destroyed or transferred to one of two WHO reference laboratories which had BSL-4 facilities: the Centers for Disease Control and Prevention (CDC) in the United States and the State Research Center of Virology and Biotechnology VECTOR in Koltsovo, Russia.

At the time of the outbreak, the WHO had been about to certify that smallpox had been eradicated globally. It eventually did so in 1980.

See also

 Rahima Banu, last person infected with naturally occurring Variola major
 Ali Maow Maalin, last person infected with naturally occurring Variola minor
 List of unusual deaths

References

Bibliography

 Jonathan B. Tucker, Scourge: The Once and Future Threat of Smallpox (Grove Press) 2002    (online)

External links
 "The Lonely Death of Janet Parker", Birmingham Live
 Portrait photograph (pre-1978) of Janet Parker  (online)
1978 newspaper article Smallpox virus escapes (online)
1978 newspaper article about Janet Parker's father being taken into quarantine (online)
1978 newspaper article about Janet Parker's mother being released from quarantine (online)

Smallpox outbreak
Smallpox outbreak, 1978
Smallpox outbreak in the United Kingdom, 1978
Smallpox outbreak
Smallpox outbreak
Deaths from smallpox
Deaths from laboratory accidents
Health in Birmingham, West Midlands
Infectious disease deaths in England
Smallpox eradication
United Kingdom, 1978

ar:جانيت باركر   
da:Janet Parker
de:Janet Parker
es:Janet Parker
nl:Janet Parker
ja:ジャネット・パーカー
pl:Janet Parker
pt:Janet Parker